The Kaunertal is a  municipality and alpine valley in the Landeck district in the Austrian state of Tyrol.

The Kaunertal valley is 28 km (17 mi) in length and runs southeast from the town of Prutz (884 m) to the Kaunertal Glacier. The valley is traversed by the Faggenbach river, which rises south of the Weißseespitze mountain (3044 m) and flows into the Inn river at Prutz (884 m), the site of a hydroelectric power station. The dam was constructed in 1961. Water from the lake is used to generate electricity through a pipe system  in length, located at the south end of the Kaunertal. The generator facility at Prutz produces 620 million kilowatt hours per year.

The main town in the valley is Kauns (1050 m), located near the Inn river, with its Schranz Chapel containing the Kauner Kreuz. The Kaunertal Glacier Road continues up to the Weißenseeferner glacier. This toll road is the fifth highest paved road in the Alps and reaches an elevation of 2750 m (9025 ft). The main source of income is this glacier ski area with  slopes and 10 lifts, which was opened in 1982.

The ruins of the thirteenth-century Bernegg Castle with its Gothic chapel are also located in the valley.

See also
 List of mountain passes

References

External links

 Kaunertal Tourist Guide 
 Kaunertal live cam

Valleys of Tyrol (state)
Cities and towns in Landeck District